Coleophora longiductella is a moth of the family Coleophoridae. It is found in Iran, Pakistan and Yemen.

References

longiductella
Moths described in 1989
Moths of the Arabian Peninsula
Insects of Iran
Moths of Asia